Vikram Varma is an Indian advocate based in Goa who is originally from New Delhi. He achieved prominence in representing highly publicized cases by the news media, mostly involving foreigners, such as the Scarlett Keeling case. The Keeling case started when some local authorities tried to cover up the death of a 15-year-old British girl as a drowning accident.

The Russian Consulate appointed Varma as their advocate in Goa.

On 4 December 2011, the Russian Government used one of Varma's premises as a polling booth for its national elections. As this was the first time that voting facilities were provided to Russians in India outside of its Embassy, it was widely reported by the Indian media such as Times of India and DNA.

References

Date of birth missing (living people)
20th-century births
Living people
People from New Delhi
Indian barristers
Year of birth missing (living people)